Balsorano is a comune (municipality) and town in the province of L'Aquila in the Abruzzo region of Italy.

History 
Balsorano is mentioned for the first time in the 10th century. During the Middle Ages and modern era, it was held by the Piccolomini baronial family.

Main sights
 Piccolomini castle: The castle was built by Antonio Piccolomini, nephew of pope Pius II, in 1460.
Now it is a hotel and it has been used as location for several Italian movies.

References

.                 

 
Marsica